Timothy Zook Keith is an American psychologist. His research is focused on the nature and measurement of intelligence, understanding school learning, and on the methodologies of confirmatory factor analysis and structural equation modelling, and he  is considered a leading authority on in the use of structural equation modeling and confirmatory factor analysis in school psychology. He has been a Fellow of the American Psychological Association since 1991.

He earned his B.A. in Psychology from the University of North Carolina at Chapel Hill in 1974, his M.A. in School Psychology from East Carolina University in 1978, and his Ph.D. in School Psychology from Duke University in 1982. He taught at University of Iowa from 1982 to 1987, Virginia Polytechnic Institute from 1987 to 1993, Alfred University from 1993 to 2001, and has been at University of Texas, Austin since 2001.

In 1994, he was one of 52 signatories on "Mainstream Science on Intelligence," an editorial written by Linda Gottfredson and published in the Wall Street Journal, which declared the consensus of the signing scholars on issues related to intelligence following the publication of the book The Bell Curve.

References

External links
 home page
 Timothy Z. Keith curriculum vitae (PDF)

Living people
University of North Carolina at Chapel Hill alumni
Duke University alumni
21st-century American psychologists
Alfred University faculty
East Carolina University alumni
Virginia Tech faculty
University of Iowa faculty
University of Texas at Austin faculty
Fellows of the American Psychological Association
Year of birth missing (living people)